Jay Aston Emmanuel-Thomas (born 27 December 1990) is an English professional footballer who plays as a forward for Indian Super League club Jamshedpur. A product of the Arsenal Academy, he is a versatile forward and can play as a winger or striker.

Club career

Arsenal
Born in London to a St. Lucian mother and a Dominican father, Emmanuel-Thomas is a midfielder who has also played as left-back, left winger and centre-forward. He was at Arsenal from the age of eight, when he was spotted playing for his father's team by a "Gunners" scout, who invited him for dinner. He became captain of the under-18 youth team when he was just 16 years old. In the summer of 2008 he signed his first professional contract with the club.

2008–09 season
On 6 August 2008, Emmanuel-Thomas played in Arsenal's pre-season friendly 2–1 win over Huddersfield Town at the Galpharm Stadium. Three days later he played for the first team in their 1–1 draw with Spanish La Liga side Sevilla in the pre-season Amsterdam Tournament at the Amsterdam Arena. In the 2008–09 season he made 39 appearances for both the youth and reserve teams, scoring seven goals. He captained the youth team as they were crowned Premier Academy League champions. They were first in Group A and after beating Group C winners Manchester City 2–1 in the semi-finals, they beat club rivals Tottenham Hotspur 1–0 in the play-off final on 17 May 2009 at White Hart Lane.

He also played a big part in the youth team winning the 2008–09 FA Youth Cup, in which he scored in every round. Arsenal beat Liverpool 6–2 on aggregate in the two-legged final, with Emmanuel-Thomas captaining the side and also scoring in the 4–1 first leg win at the Emirates Stadium. He thus attained the Youth Premiership and FA Cup double together with the rest of the club's youth team that year.

He also formed part of the squad in first team matches during the 2008–09 season on two occasions. Firstly, on 23 September 2008 in the Gunners 6–0 League Cup victory over Sheffield United. Then again in Arsenal's 3–0 Premier League victory over Portsmouth on 2 May 2009.

2009–10 season

Emmanuel-Thomas was an unused substitute for the Premier League games against Burnley on 16 December and Hull City three days later as well as Everton on 9 January 2010. On 18 December he signed a new long-term contract. He scored a hat-trick for the reserves in their 4–2 Premier Reserve League South win over West Ham United at Upton Park on 12 January 2010. He made his Arsenal debut when he started the 4th round FA Cup tie against Stoke on 24 January 2010. Playing as a striker in a 3-man attack, he was substituted after 66 minutes.

Blackpool (loan)
After attending Blackpool's first home game of the 2009–10 season, he signed a one-month loan deal with the club. Blackpool manager Ian Holloway said, "I am delighted to have Jay. He is a fantastic young lad, he has a great physique and he wants the chance to come out and play. Initially it is just a month but I hope to convince him we can build on that and extend it for a longer period." The following day he made his professional debut as a 57th-minute substitute, replacing David Vaughan in a 0–0 home draw with Derby County.

Talking about his debut, Emmanuel-Thomas said, "It was great and I enjoyed it. I've come to Blackpool to prove that I can play against men who are older and perhaps stronger than me, and that I can handle myself without any problems. Hopefully it will be good for me and will help me." He then scored on his full debut on 21 August in a 2–2 draw with Watford at Vicarage Road, when his powerful header in the 56th minute went past Hornets goalkeeper Scott Loach.

On 18 September, after five appearances, his loan spell with the Tangerines was extended by a further two months. He scored his second goal for the Seasiders on 31 October in a 3–3 draw with Doncaster Rovers at the Keepmoat Stadium. On 3 November, with his three-month loan spell ending after the home clash with Scunthorpe United the following Saturday, it was revealed that Ian Holloway hoped to re-sign Emmanuel-Thomas on a half-season loan in January 2010.

Doncaster Rovers (loan)
On 27 February 2010, he signed a one-month loan deal with Doncaster Rovers. He made his debut with the team the same day as substitute of James Hayter at the 76-minute. Emmanual-Thomas started the next game away against Bristol City and scored twice as Doncaster won the game 5–2. His loan was later extended till the end of the 2009–10 season.

2010–11 season
Emmanuel-Thomas started the season in great form for the reserves, scoring 10 in 9 appearances. He made his first league appearance for the senior team against Chelsea on 3 October coming on for Jack Wilshere in the 81st minute. Manager Arsène Wenger was effusive in his praise for Emmanuel-Thomas stating, "When his fitness is right, Jay will be not only a good player but a great player". He scored a goal using the "hocus pocus" skill to get past two defenders and shoot past the goalkeeper in a reserve match against Everton and fuelled speculation that he should be playing at a far higher level.

Cardiff City (loan)

On 18 January 2011, Emmanuel-Thomas announced on his Twitter page that he had signed for Cardiff City on loan until the end of the season. Toward the end of his loan spell he was drafted out of the match day 18 in order to facilitate Jason Koumas among the substitutes.

Ipswich Town
2011–12 season
On 26 July 2011, Emmanuel-Thomas signed for Championship club Ipswich Town for an undisclosed fee. He scored his first goal for Ipswich in a 2–1 League Cup defeat to Northampton Town on 9 August 2011. His first league goal proved only to be a consolation as Ipswich were beaten 5–2 by Southampton on 16 August. Despite notching his first goal for the club, it was clear that Emmanuel-Thomas was still someway from his best, and was only showing glimpses of the trickery he had displayed in the Arsenal reserves. However, as the season moved into 2012, he really began to show the sort of form Ipswich fans had expected of him, despite the fact that the team were experiencing a poor run of form. After a number of long range efforts that had stung various keepers' fingertips and rattled the woodwork, Emmanuel-Thomas picked up his second and third goals for Town, as they pulled out one of the most surprising results of the season by hammering league leaders West Ham United 5–1.

2012–13 season
Emmanuel-Thomas scored his fourth goal for Ipswich on 4 February scoring his first away goal against Coventry City.

Bristol City
2013–14 season
On 8 July 2013, Emmanuel-Thomas signed for Bristol City on a two-year contract in a straight player-swap deal with winger Paul Anderson moving to Ipswich. On 3 August 2013, Emmanuel-Thomas scored on his debut for Bristol City. He scored his first professional hat trick on 26 October against Carlisle United to take his tally to ten goals for the season. Emmanuel-Thomas finished the season with 21 goals. His strike partner Sam Baldock had scored 26 goals, meaning the two were the third best strike partnership in England with 47 goals between them in the 2013–14 season.

2014–15 season
To start the 2014–15 season, Emmanuel-Thomas was used sparingly as new signings Kieran Agard and Aaron Wilbraham flourished in attack for City. Bristol City started the season with a 22-game unbeaten run, propelling them to the top of League One and setting a new club record. Emmanuel-Thomas's first goal of the season came in a 2–1 away victory against Notts County on 31 August 2014. He then went 11 league games without scoring a goal, but finally broke his duck against Yeovil Town in a 2–1 home win on Boxing Day. After injuries to both Agard and Wilbraham, Emmanuel-Thomas shone in attack alongside loan signing Matt Smith, including setting up Smith for two of his four goals against Gillingham in the Football League Trophy Southern Area Final. Emmanuel-Thomas scored both goals as Bristol City beat Doncaster Rovers in an FA Cup 3rd round replay at Ashton Gate, before scoring in back-to-back games against Scunthorpe United and Fleetwood Town. On 10 February 2015, he scored a 25-yard strike in City's 3–1 home win against Port Vale, taking his tally of league goals to seven for the season and extending City's lead at the top of League One to four points, with a game in hand over second-placed Swindon Town.

Queens Park Rangers
On 12 June 2015, it was announced that Emmanuel-Thomas would join Queens Park Rangers on a free transfer when his contract at Bristol City expired in the summer. Thomas made his competitive QPR debut in the first game of the 2015–16 Championship season which resulted in a 2–0 defeat against Charlton Athletic, he came on as a substitute replacing Tjaronn Chery in the 71st minute. He scored his first goal for QPR in a Football League Cup match against Yeovil Town as they secured a 3–0 victory. On 3 October 2015, Emmanuel-Thomas scored his first league goals for Queens Park Rangers, in a double which helped his side to a 4–3 win over Bolton Wanderers.

Emmanuel-Thomas left the club at the end of the 2017–18 season.

Milton Keynes Dons (loan)
On 1 February 2016, Emmanuel-Thomas joined Championship rivals Milton Keynes Dons on loan for the remainder of the 2015–16 campaign.

Gillingham (loan)
On 5 August 2016, Emmanuel-Thomas joined League One side Gillingham on a season-long loan for the 2016–17 campaign. He scored on his debut in a 3–1 win over Southend United on 6 August 2016. He then scored twice more when Gillingham played Southend again three days later in the EFL Cup. He scored 10 goals from 35 appearances for Gillingham before returning to QPR, cutting his loan short in February 2017.

PTT Rayong
In January 2019 Emmanuel-Thomas joined PTT Rayong in Thailand.

Livingston
On 30 September 2020, Emmanuel-Thomas joined Scottish Premiership club Livingston on a one-year deal with an option of a second year. He featured as a substitute in the February 2021 Scottish League Cup Final which saw Livingston lose 1–0 to St Johnstone.

 Aberdeen 
On 18 May 2021, it was announced that Emmanuel-Thomas would join fellow Scottish Premiership side Aberdeen on a two-year deal after his contract with Livingston expired. On 12 April 2022, Emmanuel-Thomas had his contract terminated by the club.

 Jamshedpur 
On 12 August 2022, Emmanuel-Thomas joined the Indian club Jamshedpur FC as one of their designated overseas players for the 2022–23 Indian Super League season. He was allocated the number 10 jersey.

International career
Emmanuel-Thomas has played for the England under-17 team. In December 2009, he was part of the under-19 squad that qualified for the Elite qualifying round of the 2009 UEFA European Under-19 Championship.

Emmanuel-Thomas is also eligible to play for West Indies nations Saint Lucia and Dominica.

 Career statistics 

HonoursArsenalFA Youth Cup: 2008–09
Premier Academy League: 2008–09Bristol CityFootball League One: 2014–15
Football League Trophy: 2014–15LivingstonScottish League Cup runner-up: 2020–21Individual'
PFA League One Player of the Month: January 2015

References

External links

Jay Emmanuel-Thomas profile at Arsenal FC (archived)

1990 births
Living people
Footballers from Forest Gate
English people of Saint Lucian descent
English people of Dominica descent
English footballers
Black British sportsmen
England youth international footballers
Association football defenders
Association football midfielders
Association football forwards
Association football utility players
Arsenal F.C. players
Blackpool F.C. players
Doncaster Rovers F.C. players
Cardiff City F.C. players
Ipswich Town F.C. players
Bristol City F.C. players
Queens Park Rangers F.C. players
Milton Keynes Dons F.C. players
Gillingham F.C. players
Jay Emmanuel-Thomas
Livingston F.C. players
Aberdeen F.C. players
Jamshedpur FC players
Premier League players
English Football League players
Jay Emmanuel-Thomas
Scottish Professional Football League players
English expatriate footballers
Expatriate footballers in Thailand
Expatriate footballers in India
English expatriate sportspeople in Thailand
English expatriate sportspeople in India